Terminal 1 station, or Pearson station, is a railway and people-mover station at Toronto Pearson International Airport in Mississauga, Ontario, Canada. It is the eastern terminus of the inter-terminal Link Train, and the western terminus of the Union Pearson Express.

Overview

The station consists of two connected island platforms serving four tracks.  The outermost pair of tracks runs the full length of the station and serves the Link Train on the southern platform, while the innermost pair terminates halfway along the station and serves the Union Pearson Express on the northern platform. Both platforms are climate-controlled, and access to trains is via platform screen doors.

History
Terminal 1 station opened in July 2006 as a terminus of the three-station Link train. The structure included support pillars allowing the station to be expanded to serve a future airport rail link to downtown Toronto.

In July 2010, Metrolinx, Toronto's regional transport agency, announced it would create a mainline rail connection to Pearson Airport from Union Station. Construction of the spur began in June 2012 at a budget of C$128.6 million. By June 2013 the bulk of the structure including caissons, columns and girders were complete and the first beam of the new station was poured. The station shell was completed by December 2013.

The line opened on June 6, 2015, in time for the 2015 Pan American Games.

Services
The Link Train operates every four minutes throughout most of the day, and every eight minutes between 7:30am and 11:30am, and between 11:30pm and 3:30am.  The full trip to Viscount station takes under four minutes.

The Union Pearson Express operates every 15 minutes throughout the day, with a 25-minute travel time to Union Station in Downtown Toronto.

Ticket vending machines for UP Express are found at the entrance from the airport. There is a cold beverage vending machine located at the end of the platform.

Connections
Several local transit systems provide bus service to Pearson at Terminal 1, which operate from the ground level of Terminal 1 (second curb, Column R4), two floors below the train station.

 Toronto Transit Commission (these buses make an additional stop at Terminal 3 after leaving Terminal 1)
 Routes 300A, 332, and 352 provide overnight TTC service
 MiWay (Mississauga Transit) routes 7 (SB to Mississauga City Centre Transit Terminal & NB to Westwood Mall) and 100 (Winston Churchill Station)
 Brampton Transit route 115 (Züm and Miway connections at Bramalea Terminal)
 GO Transit routes 34 (Finch, Sheppard–Yonge and Yorkdale stations on Line 1 Yonge–University, as well as GO Transit Yorkdale Bus Terminal) and 40 (York Region Transit connection at Richmond Hill Centre Terminal and Hamilton Street Railway connections at Hamilton GO Centre)

References

External links

Toronto Pearson International Airport
Metrolinx
Railway stations in Mississauga
Airport railway stations in Canada
Railway stations in Canada opened in 2006
2006 establishments in Ontario